An Old, Old Tale is a 1968 Soviet musical film directed by Nadezhda Kosheverova. It is based on four fairy tales by Hans Christian Andersen: "The Tinderbox", "The Travelling Companion", "The Swineherd" and "Blockhead Hans".

Plot

Prologue
A poor wandering puppeteer gives a performance in a roadside inn to pay for a pint of beer and dinner. The audience applauds, and the happy owner asks his daughter to lavishly wine and dine the actor. The puppeteer and the daughter of the innkeeper become so in love with each other that they plan to run away together at dawn. At night, the dolls come to life. They are very upset by the future parting and ask their owner not to leave them. The latter wants to start a family and acquire a more profound profession. Knowing that he can not fall asleep until morning, the puppeteer asks the puppets to play a fairy tale for him, like a performance, which they do.

Performance
Under a cheerful song-march, a soldier walks along the road and meets a witch. She suggests that he go down into the magic well and collect as many gold coins as he can carry, and then share the wealth with her in half. The soldier descends into the well and fills the bucket with money, but the "devil's grandma", after pulling out the money refuses to retrieve the soldier from the well. He climbs out by himself and chops off the witch's head for treachery. Having put a cabbage head on instead of her human head, the witch runs away.

Having defeated the witch, the soldier thereby breaks a spell which caused a good wizard to turn into a black cat. In gratitude for salvation, the wizard gives the soldier a wondrous flint and promises his help at any time - it is enough to just hit the flint. For the time being the soldier forgets about the flint. Before him lies the path to the kingdom, where he immediately encounters a huge queue of princes - in a small state a princess is being given away for marriage despite her wishes.

The soldier falls in love with the princess, who gives riddles to her numerous fiancés, and comes to her to woo. But she drives the hapless lover away, as her father, the king, very much wants to see the soldier as her husband because he thinks that he has a lot of gold. Wishing to smoke, the soldier gathers a light and gets a spark from the flint, which causes the wizard to appear who is ready to fulfill any of his wishes. The servant asks for a miracle - to bring the princess to him. Reluctantly the sorcerer agrees.

The young couple is walking on the roofs and are chatting cordially, the girl thinks that all this is a dream. After an attempt to kiss her, the heir to the throne understands that everything is happening for real, and returns home. In the morning she promises the king to marry someone who can solve a logical problem. No one is able to guess the riddles. The soldier summons a wizard who gives him a clue, but after a seemingly successful exam, the king still orders the execution of the serviceman.

At the trial the soldier asks to fulfill his last wish - to smoke, and using the flint summons the same magician who frees the hero. The frightened princess agrees to marry him. The young man is promoted to general and is given a new uniform, but he intends to leave the inhospitable kingdom because the girl does not love him.

At parting, he kisses the princess and leaves her in tears. Again, he leaves somewhere, but the girl catches up with the soldier. It turns out that she was bewitched and that was why she was so evil and capricious. With his kiss, he broke the enchantment and the princess wants to be with him. This concludes the performance.

Epilogue
In the morning the daughter of the innkeeper informs the puppeteer about her decision to stay - she can not leave her father and her home. Then he leaves with his dolls for good.

Cast
Oleg Dahl - soldier / puppeteer
Marina Neyolova - princess / daughter of innkeeper
Vladimir Etush - the king / innkeeper
Georgy Vitsin - kind magician
Vera Titova - witch
Victor Perevalov - Prince-chimney sweeper
Igor Dmitriev - oriental prince
Georgy Shtil - bodyguard of the princess
Boris Leskin - coachman
Anatoly Korolkevich - doorman
Georgiy Gheorghiu - Fatty (in credits as "V.Georgiou")
Lev Lemke - Thin
Anatoly Abramov - the first suitor

References

External links

Lenfilm films
Soviet musical fantasy films
1960s musical fantasy films
Films directed by Nadezhda Kosheverova
Films based on works by Hans Christian Andersen
Films based on fairy tales
1960s Russian-language films